Weir Greenhouse is a historic greenhouse located across the street from the main entrance of Green-Wood Cemetery in Sunset Park, Brooklyn, New York City. It was designed by George Curtis Gillespie and built in 1895 by James Weir, Jr., a Brooklyn florist who had been in business for 50 years when he built the greenhouse for the business he operated with his son and grandson. It is a rectangular, wood frame and galvanized iron building with projecting bays and domes in the Victorian commercial style. The main entrance is set at an angle to the street corner and is octagonal in form. The rooftop features an octagonal cupola with a ball finial. Attached to the greenhouse is a one-story brick office structure.

The Weirs continued to operate the business until 1971, when they sold to the McGovern family. The building was designated a New York City Landmark in 1982. On February 2, 2012, the Weir Greenhouse was purchased by the neighboring Green-Wood Cemetery, which planned to preserve the greenhouse and restore elements which have decayed in recent years. By early 2015, structural stabilization of the vacant, decayed building was complete, and the project was scheduled to move toward restoration of the building to its 1895 appearance. , the restoration is still underway, but Green-Wood planned to convert the greenhouse into the cemetery's visitor center.

The greenhouse was made a New York City designated landmark in 1982. It was listed on the National Register of Historic Places in 1984.

See also 
 List of New York City Designated Landmarks in Brooklyn
 National Register of Historic Places listings in Kings County, New York

References

External links 
 Lost City blog: Inside the McGovern-Weir Greenhouse

Buildings and structures on the National Register of Historic Places in New York City
Buildings and structures in Brooklyn
Infrastructure completed in 1895
New York City Designated Landmarks in Brooklyn
Sunset Park, Brooklyn
National Register of Historic Places in Brooklyn